Houssen is a commune in the Haut-Rhin department in Grand Est in north-eastern France. It is located near Colmar, the department capital and the Colmar Airport. It is near the border of Germany and thus has acquired many influences of the German culture including architecture, cuisine, and art.

See also

 Communes of the Haut-Rhin département

References

Communes of Haut-Rhin